Knocksedan is a townland near the town of Swords in Ireland. It is situated along the Naul Road (R108) to the west of Swords on either side of the Ward River.
In advance of the 1916 Easter Rising, Knocksedan was muster point for the Fingal battalion of the Irish Volunteers.

Housing estate 

Knocksedan Demesne is a housing estate on the east side of the Naul Road.  It is separated from the main town of Swords, and contains approximately 160 houses with no shops or community facilities. In January 2017, the 41X Dublin Bus route began a service from Knocksedan after campaigning from the residents. A localink bus, provided by Flexibus Local Link, serves the estate between Knocksedan and Swords Pavilions, however this stops at 7pm every night and does not run on Sundays.

The planning application for the second phase of Knocksedan Demesne involved permission for 191 four and five bedroom houses. Construction of the second phase of Knocksedan Demesne began in July 2014.

Heliport 
Knocksedan Heliport is located on the west side on the Naul Road. It is run by Celtic Helicopters, which was founded in 1985, and has four hangars. Irish Helicopters also use the heliport. They provide aerial crane, aerial filming, aerial survey, charter, maintenance and other services.

Park 

The Ward River Valley Park is a large linear park on the banks of the Ward River. It covers an area of 89 ha. (220 acres) between Swords Town Centre and Knocksedan Bridge. Its features include the ruins of 12th-century fortifications, including a motte and bailey, woodland habitats, wetlands and grasslands. There are several picnic sites, sports pitches and tennis courts.

References 

Neighbourhoods in Swords, Dublin
Townlands of Fingal